WKLR (96.5 FM) is a classic rock formatted broadcast radio station licensed to Fort Lee, Virginia, serving Richmond and Petersburg in Virginia.  WKLR is owned and operated by SummitMedia.  The station's studios and offices are located west of Richmond proper in unincorporated Chesterfield County, and its transmitter is located in Chester, Virginia.

HD Radio 
WKLR is licensed by the FCC to broadcast in the HD Radio format, and broadcasts one HD subchannel:

 WKLR-HD3 retransmits WPER, Fredericksburg, VA, which features Contemporary Christian music and feeds translator W273BB at 102.5 in Richmond.

References

External links
Classic Rock 96-5 Online

1963 establishments in Virginia
Classic rock radio stations in the United States
Radio stations established in 1963
KLR